Ícaro do Carmo Silva (born 16 April 1989) is a Brazilian footballer who plays for Portuguese club Académico de Viseu.

Club career
On 13 June 2022, Ícaro signed a one-year deal with Académico de Viseu.

References

1989 births
Sportspeople from Minas Gerais
Living people
Brazilian footballers
Association football central defenders
Boavista Sport Club players
Legião Futebol Clube players
Grêmio Esportivo Anápolis players
C.D. Feirense players
G.D. Chaves players
C.D. Tondela players
Académico de Viseu F.C. players
Primeira Liga players
Liga Portugal 2 players
Brazilian expatriate footballers
Brazilian expatriate sportspeople in Portugal
Expatriate footballers in Portugal